

Clubs

Results

League table

C